A zero shadow day is a day on which the Sun does not cast a shadow of an object at noon, when the sun will be exactly at the zenith position. Zero shadow day happens twice a year for locations between +23.5 and -23.5 degrees of latitude (between the tropics of Cancer and Capricorn, respectively). The dates will vary for different locations on Earth. This phenomenon occurs when the Sun's declination becomes equal to the latitude of the location. On a zero shadow day, when the sun crosses the local meridian, the sun's rays will fall exactly vertical relative to an object on the ground and one cannot observe any shadow of that object.

See also
Sundial
Lahaina Noon
Qibla observation by shadows

References

Astronomical events